Eric Williams (born 10 July 1921) is an English footballer who played as a full back in the Football League for Manchester City and Halifax Town.

References

1921 births
Possibly living people
Manchester City F.C. players
Mossley A.F.C. players
Halifax Town A.F.C. players
English Football League players
English footballers
Footballers from Salford
Association football fullbacks